Kyuna is an affluent neighbourhood in the city of Nairobi.

Overview
It borders the Loresho and the Spring Valley neighbourhoods. Kyuna together with Kitisuru and Loresho sub-locations form the Kitisuru Ward of Nairobi City County.

Kyuna is zoned as a low-density neighbourhood with single family residential units allowed to be built within the estate. It is an exclusive neighbourhood that is inhabited by  the high-income segment of Nairobi residents.

As of 2019, Kyuna has a population of 6,026, and a population density of 1,980/km2 in a land area of 3km2.

References

 

Suburbs of Nairobi